Circus Maximus is an ancient arena and mass entertainment venue located in Rome.

Circus Maximus may also refer to:

 Circus Maximus (American band), a 1960s band featuring Jerry Jeff Walker
 Circus Maximus (Norwegian band), a 2000s progressive metal band
 Symphony No. 3 (Corigliano) or Symphony No. 3, Circus Maximus, a piece for large wind band by American composer John Corigliano
 The Circus Maximus, a 1992 album by Manilla Road
 Circus Maximus (Momus album), 1986
 "Circus Maximus", a song by the band Clutch from their 2005 album Robot Hive/Exodus
 Circus Maximus: Chariot Wars, a 2002 video game
 Circus Maximus (game), a chariot-racing board game
 Circus Maximus (horse) (born 2016), winner of the 2019 St James's Palace Stakes
 Circo Massimo (Rome Metro), a station of the Rome Metro